Joy Ride 2: Dead Ahead is a 2008 American horror film and the sequel to Joy Ride (2001). The film was directed by Louis Morneau and stars Nicki Aycox, Nick Zano, Kyle Schmid, Laura Jordan and Mark Gibbon. The film was released direct-to-video on October 7, 2008. It was followed by a sequel, Joy Ride 3: Roadkill (2014).

Plot 
Melissa Scott and her fiancé Bobby Lawrence are on a cross country road trip to Las Vegas to get married. Joining them for the ride is Melissa's sister Kayla and Kayla's online boyfriend Nik.

During the trip, their car breaks down in the desert. Whilst looking for help, the four find a seemingly abandoned barn, in which they find a silver 1971 Chevrolet Chevelle in working order with a full tank of gas. The four reluctantly steal the car, although Melissa leaves a note in the house with her contact details for the owner of the car to find.

The next day, Melissa receives a phone call from Rusty Nail. He refers to Melissa as "Goldilocks", revealing that he can see her, and Bobby soon disappears from a diner restroom. The others find a CB radio in the car, through which Rusty Nail orders them to destroy their cellphones and obey his orders if Bobby is to survive. He requests for Kayla to cut off her middle finger, mirroring an earlier incident when she had flipped off a trucker who turned out to be Rusty himself. The group heads to a mortuary hospital, where Kayla cuts a finger from a corpse, but Rusty, knowing they have broken the rules, cuts off Bobby's finger and puts it in the glove compartment of the Chevelle, where it is eventually discovered by the group.

Rusty soon pulls up at a bar in Utah, and Bobby tries to escape. He gains the attention of a bartender, who tries to help out, but Rusty catches him in the act and kills the bartender. Nik then gets kidnapped by Rusty, and Melissa and Kayla chase them in the Chevelle. However, Rusty manages to ram the car several times in his truck, flipping the Chevelle over. Melissa manages to escape, but Kayla gets trapped and is killed after Rusty plows into the car again.

Rusty takes Bobby and Nik back to his home and sadistically tortures them, eventually killing Nik by impaling a steel bar through his head. Melissa, meanwhile, breaks into a police station and steals a motor bike, racing off to find Bobby. She eventually tracks Rusty down, and, after using the motor bike as a distraction, beats Rusty down with a shovel. She drives away in his truck, with Bobby locked in the trailer, but the trailer disconnects and leaves Bobby behind. Rusty manages to grab on to the side of the truck and climb on the roof. A scuffle ensues, in which Melissa manages to jump out of the truck right before it goes flying off of the edge of the cliff, upon where it explodes on impact. Bobby escapes from the trailer and meets back up with Melissa.

Later, Rusty is revealed to have miraculously survived the explosion after he picks up a girl whose car has broken down.

Cast
 Nicki Aycox as Melissa Scott
 Nick Zano as Bobby Lawrence
 Laura Jordan as Kayla Scott
 Kyle Schmid as Nick "Nik" Parker
 Mark Gibbon as Rusty Nail
 Krystal Vrba as Lot Lizard 
 Kathryn Kirkpatrick as Big Wheels Waitress 
 Rob Carpenter as Trucker #1 
 Gordon Tipple as Trucker #2 
 Rebecca Davis as Woman Stuck In Snow 
 Daniel Boileau as Bald Trucker 
 Lyle St. Goddard as Kenny Chesney (credited as Goofy Looking Truck Driver)
 Mackenzie Gray as The Bartender 
 Sean Tyson as Drunk Trucker #1  
 Chris Kalhoon as Drunk Trucker #2 
 Gardiner Millar as The Mortician 
 Colette Hills as Female Corpse

Development 
Originally titled Joy Ride 2: End of the Road in promotional artwork, Joy Ride 2: Dead Ahead was filmed in British Columbia, Canada, at Cache Creek, Kamloops and Vancouver.

Like the original film, Joy Ride 2: Dead Ahead was produced and distributed by 20th Century Fox Home Entertainment, although unlike the original it was direct-to-DVD.

Release 
The film was released on DVD on October 7, 2008 in the United States and opened at #9 at the DVD sales chart, making $1,492,635 off 62,000 sold DVD units. As per the latest figures, 200,000 units have been sold, translating to $4,307,361 in revenue. This does not include Blu-ray sales/DVD rentals.

References

External links 
 

2008 films
2008 direct-to-video films
20th Century Fox direct-to-video films
Direct-to-video thriller films
Direct-to-video sequel films
Films set in abandoned houses
Films set in the United States
Films shot in Vancouver
American road movies
2000s road movies
Trucker films
American serial killer films
Films scored by Joe Kraemer
Films directed by Louis Morneau
2000s English-language films
2000s American films